Shirvan State Reserve was established on the area of  of a part of Bendovan State Game reserve in 1969 for the purpose of protecting and increasing the number of water birds.

Ecology

The reserves is characterized by rich ornithological fauna. Rare and valuable birds nest and winter in the swampy areas. The largest part of the reserve was transferred to the Shirvan National Park in 2003, and the area of the reserve currently totals .

Fauna and flora

Etymology

The names of the reserve and national park appear to be derived from the word Shīr ('Lion'). The Asiatic lion used to occur in the Trans-Caucasus, including this area, before the end of the 10th century. A reason for its extinction here is that it was hunted by hunters, including 'shirvans' or 'shirvanshakhs', who were native to the Trans-Caucasus.

See also
 Nature of Azerbaijan
 National Parks of Azerbaijan
 State Reserves of Azerbaijan
 State Game Reserves of Azerbaijan

References

State reserves of Azerbaijan
1969 establishments in Azerbaijan